The Awakening is a 1954 short drama film of Douglas Fairbanks Presents anthology series based on Nikolai Gogol's short story "The Overcoat".

The Man is a first dramatic role of Buster Keaton. Fairbanks says, "It struck me as a beautiful idea — a novel idea — to put him in a straight part, because he was such a beautiful actor and a great talent. It worked out very well; he gave a marvelous performance".

The original plot of Gogol's story is significantly changed. There are allusions to George Orwell's Nineteen Eighty-Four dystopia in the film.

Cast 
 Buster Keaton — The Man
 James Hayter — The Chief
 Carl Jaffe — The Tailor
 Lynne Cole — The Girl
 Geoffrey Keen — The Supervisor
 Christopher Lee — The Thief
 Douglas Fairbanks Jr. — Himself - Host

References

External links
 

Films based on The Overcoat
1954 films
1954 drama films
1950s English-language films
American drama films
British drama films
British black-and-white films
1950s American films
1950s British films